Kapsner is a surname of German origin. Notable people with the surname include:

Carol Ronning Kapsner (born 1947), American judge
Celestine Kapsner (1892–1973), American priest
Mary Kapsner (born 1973), American politician

See also
Kasner

German-language surnames